A House with a View of the Sea is a 2001 black-and-white Venezuelan film directed by Alberto Arvelo, and a Spain-Canada co-production with Venezuela. It was Venezuela's submission to the 74th Academy Awards for the Academy Award for Best Foreign Language Film, but was not accepted as a nominee. It was first released in Europe in 2003, before its Venezuelan premiere a year later.

It stars Imanol Arias, Gabriel Arcand, and Leandro Arvelo.

ABC describes the film as an "intimate and crude history about the Venezuelan peasants of 1948".

Synopsis 
Based on the novel Vincentino Guerrero by Freddy Sosa, it tells the story of a farming family in 1948 Los Andes headed by Tomás Alonso that is broken when his wife dies, leaving him to take care of his son alone. To console him, Tomás gives his son a photograph of his mother by the sea, with the boy developing a fascination for the sea. Tomás struggles with wanting his son to love the farmland and protecting the boy from their richer neighbors.

Cast 

 Imanol Arias
 Gabriel Arcand
 Leandro Arvelo
 Alejo Felipe
 Héctor Manrique
 Manuela Aguirre
 Marcel Jaworski
 Nerio Zerpa
 Bernardino Angel
 Ramona Pérez

Awards

See also

List of submissions to the 74th Academy Awards for Best Foreign Language Film

References

External links

A House with a View of the Sea at Cine Mestizo

2001 films
Venezuelan drama films
2000s Spanish-language films
2001 drama films